The Pacific swallow (Hirundo tahitica) is a small  passerine bird in the swallow family. It breeds in tropical southern Asia and the islands of the south Pacific. It is resident apart from some local seasonal movements. This bird is associated with coasts, but is increasingly spreading to forested uplands. The hill swallow and the welcome swallow were formerly considered conspecific.

This species is a small swallow at 13 cm. It has a blue-black back and crown with browner wings and tail, a red face and throat, and dusky underparts. It differs from the barn swallow and the closely related welcome swallow in its shorter and less forked tail.

The Pacific swallow builds a neat cup-shaped nest, constructed with mud pellets collected in the beak, under a cliff ledge or on man-made structures such as a building, bridge or tunnel. The nest is lined with softer material, and the clutch is two to three eggs. It is similar in behaviour to other aerial insectivores, such as other swallows and the unrelated swifts. It is a fast flyer and feeds on insects, especially flies, while airborne.

Gallery

References

Pacific swallow
Pacific swallow
Birds of Southeast Asia
Birds of New Guinea
Birds of the Pacific Ocean
Birds of Polynesia
Pacific swallow
Pacific swallow